Nesolestes is a damselfly genus. It belongs in the subfamily Argiolestinae of the flatwing damselfly family (Megapodagrionidae).

Species include:
 Nesolestes pauliani
 Nesolestes ranavalona

References

Megapodagrionidae
Taxa named by Edmond de Sélys Longchamps
Zygoptera genera
Taxonomy articles created by Polbot